Scellus crinipes  is a species of Brachycera in the family of long-legged flies.

References 

Hydrophorinae
Diptera of North America
Insects described in 1925